Dina Wein Reis (born 1964) is an American scammer.

On May 19, 2011, Wein Reis pleaded guilty to one count of intent to commit fraud after being charged in 2006 on six counts associated with a 15-year-long series of illegal business activities. Her multi-million dollar crime was covered by the CNBC television series American Greed, in the 2016 two-story episode "Seattle Roasted / The Stealing Socialite". Her plea agreement limited her federal prison time to 31 months and limited her financial penalty to $7 million in restitution on the tens of millions that she defrauded from her victims.

Wire Fraud 
In October 2008, prosecutors claimed that, over a 15-year period, Wein Reis's company had tricked manufacturers into selling her merchandise at a low price, defrauding them of tens of millions of dollars. She and her associates would call company executives with an offer of a high-paying job. Then, she would ask the executive to send her a shipment of merchandise, and she promised access to lucrative markets through her "National Distribution Program," which did not actually exist. Instead of handing out samples for free as stated, she would sell the products to middlemen who then sold them to retailers, in a practice known as product diversion. Diversion is not necessarily illegal (see Quality King v. L'anza), but in Wein Reis's case, she was charged on 6 counts for procuring the merchandise through fraud.

On May 19, 2011, Wein Reis pleaded guilty to conspiracy to commit wire fraud. In a reported plea deal with federal prosecutors, Wein Reis agreed to pay $7 million in restitution to her victims and would serve approximately 31 months out of possible 5-year sentence in federal prison.

Personal life 
Wein Reis' criminal activities supported extensive aspects of her personal life. While perpetrating her multi-million fraud, Wein Reis used some of the criminal proceeds to finance stage and television productions, fund philanthropic deeds, and purchase millions of dollars worth of art for her home. She hosted fund raising parties for such institutions as the Whitney Museum of American Art. In 2008, before pleading guilty to her criminal activities, while her lawyers were working to get her released on bond (set at $10 million), they submitted many letters of support, including one from Barbara Haskell, curator of the Whitney Museum.

References 

21st-century American businesspeople
Empire State College alumni
1964 births
Living people
American businesspeople convicted of crimes